Levente Szabó (born 6 June 1999) is a Hungarian professional footballer who plays for Fehérvár.

Club career
On 31 August 2021, Szabó was loaned to Budafoki MTE for the season.

Career statistics
.

References

External links
 
 

1999 births
People from Székesfehérvár
Living people
Hungarian footballers
Hungary youth international footballers
Association football forwards
Győri ETO FC players
Atalanta B.C. players
Genoa C.F.C. players
Fehérvár FC players
Budaörsi SC footballers
Budafoki LC footballers
Kecskeméti TE players
Nemzeti Bajnokság I players
Nemzeti Bajnokság II players
Hungarian expatriate footballers
Expatriate footballers in Italy
Hungarian expatriate sportspeople in Italy